Stefano Fusari (born 14 July 1983) is an Italian footballer who plays for Lega Pro Prima Divisione club FeralpiSalò.

Biography
Born in Brescia, Lombardy, Fusari started his career at hometown club Brescia Calcio. In January 2004 he left for Montichiari, which located within the Province of Brescia. He followed the team relegated to Serie D and promoted back to Seconda Divisione twice, in 2008 and 2010.

In 2011, he joined Prima Divisione newcomer FeralpiSalò.

Honours
 Serie D: 2010

References

External links
 Montichiari Profile (2010–11) 
 Lega Serie A Profile 
 
 Football.it Profile 

Italian footballers
Brescia Calcio players
A.C. Montichiari players
FeralpiSalò players
Association football midfielders
Footballers from Brescia
1983 births
Living people